Here Come the Habibs is an Australian television comedy series produced by Jungle Entertainment. A sitcom featuring a Lebanese Australian family who win the lottery and move to the posh eastern suburbs of Sydney, the show premiered on the Nine Network in Australia on 9 February 2016. Despite arousing some controversy as to whether it portrayed racist or stereotyped characters, it was successful, and the series was renewed for a second season, airing from 5 June 2017.

Nine program director Hamish Turner confirmed early in 2018 that the show would not be returning for a third season.

Production 
The six-part series was created by Rob Shehadie, Tahir Bilgic, Matt Ryan-Garnsey, Phil Lloyd and Ben Davies. It was written by Phil Lloyd, Gary Eck, Sam Meikle, Trent Roberts, Steve Walsh. It is directed by Darren Ashton and produced by Chloe Rickard.  

The score and theme were written by composer Kyls Burtland. The theme features Matuse, an Australian Muslim rapper, and was nominated for Best Television Theme at the 2016 APRA Screen Music Awards.

Cast

Main 

 Helen Dallimore as Olivia O'Neill
 Darren Gilshenan as Jack O'Neill
 Georgia Flood as Madison O'Neill
 Michael Denkha as Fou Fou Habib
 Camilla Ah Kin as Mariam Habib
 Sam Alhaje as Toufic Habib
 Tyler De Nawi as Elias Habib
 Kat Hoyos as Layla Habib

Recurring 
 Rob Shehadie as Jahesh
 Tahir Bilgiç as Mustafa
 Pippa Grandison as Anthea

Guest 
 Felix Williamson as Lawrence
 Phil Lloyd as Commodore
 Dave Eastgate as Officer Kemp
 Sandy Gore as Tetta
 Tony Nikolakopoulos as Jiddo
 Wendy Strehlow as Border Security
 Nicola Parry as ASIO Officer Karen
 Brandon McClelland as Blair
 Nathan Lovejoy as Bobby Peeker
 Tim Gilbert as himself
 Roy Billing as Alan
 Lucy Durack as Judy
 Anna Bamford as Samantha
 Tasneem Roc as UN Woman
 Taya Calder-Mason as Phoebe Priggs

Series overview 
<onlyinclude>

Episodes

Season 1 (2016)

Season 2 (2017)

Release

Broadcast 
The series premiered in Australia on 9 February 2016 on the Nine Network.

Home media 
Season one is available on iTunes in Australia. Series one and two were previously available on the 9now streaming platform by Channel Nine.

Ratings

Season 1

Season 2

References

External links
 
 

2016 Australian television series debuts
2017 Australian television series endings
Nine Network original programming
Australian comedy television series